Target Field is a baseball stadium in the historic warehouse district of downtown Minneapolis. Since its opening in 2010, the stadium has been the home ballpark of Major League Baseball's Minnesota Twins. The stadium hosted the 2014 Major League Baseball All-Star Game. It also has also served as the home of other local and regional baseball events.

The ballpark is open-air; though originally designed for baseball, it has also hosted football, soccer, hockey games, and concerts. 

In 2010, ESPN The Magazine ranked Target Field as the number one baseball stadium experience in North America.

Summary

Target Field is the Twins/Senators sixth ballpark, and the franchise's third in Minnesota. The Twins had played 28 seasons at the Hubert H. Humphrey Metrodome, and before that 21 seasons at Metropolitan Stadium. The Twins shared both facilities with the Minnesota Vikings, and the Metrodome with the University of Minnesota Golden Gophers football team.

The final budget for construction was $435 million, of which $175 million was paid by the Twins and $260 million was paid by Hennepin County by way of a 0.15% county-wide sales tax. An additional $120 million in infrastructure costs were split between the county ($90 million), the team ($20 million), Target Corporation ($4.5 million), the Minnesota Department of Transportation ($3.5 million) and the Minnesota Ballpark Authority ($2 million) bringing the project's total cost to US$555 million.

History

Background 
The Twins were in their 13th season in the Metrodome when they formally declared their desire to find a new home on July 18, 1994. Carl Pohlad, owner of the Twins, told the Metropolitan Sports Facilities Commission (owners of the Metrodome) the current facility was "economically obsolete" due to changes in the economy of Major League Baseball. This declaration started a process which would culminate nearly 16 years later with the opening of Target Field. In the intervening years, many ideas, financing plans and possible locations came and went. The long process included threats of relocation, infighting between the Twin Cities of Minneapolis and St. Paul, and numerous pieces of legislation (both passed and not passed) at various levels of government. The process spanned the terms of three Minnesota governors, five mayors of Minneapolis or St. Paul, and even two long-tenured Twins managers.

Timeline 

 1961 – The original Washington Senators become the Minnesota Twins, and move to Metropolitan Stadium
 1982 – Twins move to HHH Metrodome
 1984 – Calvin Griffith sells Twins to Carl Pohlad
 1994 – Pohlad declares Metrodome "economically obsolete"
 1996 – First new ballpark plan fails to win support
 1997 – Second new ballpark plan fails to win support; Minneapolis stadium contributions capped by referendum
 1998 – Referendum to build ballpark in Greensboro, NC fails
 1999 – Referendum to build ballpark in St. Paul, MN fails
 2000 – Eventual site of Target Field identified
 2001 – Twins become part of MLB's "contraction" plans
 2002 – Hennepin County makes its first financing proposal; St. Paul options eliminated
 2005 – Twins and Hennepin County reach financing agreement
 2006 – Ballpark legislation enacted
 2007 – Construction begins, land dispute settled
 2010 – Twins move to Target Field

Source: Minnesota Legislative Reference Library

Early plans (1994–1999) 

Immediately following Pohlad's 1994 declaration of intent, the Twins began making plans to build a new, retractable-roof stadium on a site just north of the Metrodome. Extensive conceptual work went into the site and stadium. At that time, the desired site was largely underused as surface parking, despite being adjacent to the Mississippi River, and located in the city's historic milling district. It included land which would be used for the Guthrie Theater (2006), Gold Medal Park (2007), and high-end housing.

1996 
The riverfront plan formed the basis for all of the early discussions, and was first presented to the Minnesota Legislature during the 1996 session. It did not pass, largely due to widespread public sentiment that Pohlad, Minnesota's second most wealthy citizen, should pay for a new facility himself.

1997 
After that failure, private negotiations between Pohlad and Governor Arne Carlson yielded a deal which was brought to the 1997 legislative session. The Twins had agreed to make an up-front financial contribution to kick-start the project, as well as sell 49% of team ownership to the state. This plan unraveled when local media reported that the complicated "contribution" to be made by the team amounted to a loan from Pohlad which was to be repaid with interest. Public outrage made passing this plan impossible.

Later that same year, the voters in Minneapolis overwhelmingly approved a referendum which prevented the city of Minneapolis from ever spending more than $10 million on a professional sports facility without approval from voters. This effectively removed the city from consideration as a financial partner for a new Twins ballpark.

1998 
Meanwhile, the Twins’ Metrodome lease was set to expire in 1998. Governor Carlson felt the issue pressing enough that he called a special session of the Minnesota Legislature for that fall. In advance of the session, Pohlad announced he had signed a letter of intent to sell the team to a potential ownership group in North Carolina (Piedmont Triad) led by Don Beaver. The sale would be nullified if either a new stadium was approved in Minnesota, or a referendum to build a new stadium in Greensboro failed.

The Minnesota legislature not only defeated the stadium bill, but passed a resolution urging Congress to intervene in what it saw to be the worst practices of professional sports. Then, on May 5, 1998, voters in Greensboro rejected the ballpark referendum by a wide margin and the sale of the team was cancelled. Meanwhile, the public had come to view Pohlad very unfavorably.

1999 
St. Paul mayor Norm Coleman jumped into this void with an enthusiastic pitch to move the Twins to his city. Several downtown locations were offered, the most likely option being adjacent to the new Xcel Energy Center (though another site considered was in the Lowertown neighborhood, a location which eventually became CHS Field, home of the St. Paul Saints). A referendum was scheduled to ask St. Paul voters to approve a sales tax increase for the city's contribution to the project, which would have been an open-air ballpark. Once again, Pohlad agreed to "sell" the team contingent upon the outcome of a referendum. This sale would have been to a group led by Minnesota-based billionaires Glen Taylor and Robert Naegele. Because Pohlad was so unpopular, it was thought that removing him from the transaction might help the prospects of the referendum, but it did not. On November 2, 1999, St. Paul voters rejected the plan by a large margin and the concept quickly evaporated.

Warehouse District site identified (2000) 

The threat of the Twins moving to St. Paul had caught the attention of the business community in Minneapolis, which, up to this point, had been largely silent on the issue. During the run-up to the St. Paul referendum in 1999, an independent working group was formed by Minneapolis businessmen Bruce Lambrecht and Rich Pogin, representatives of a group of investors which owned the Rapid Park parking lot in the historic warehouse district on the northern edge of downtown Minneapolis. This group, initially known as Minnesota Urban Ballpark, and later as MN Twinsville, formed with the express purpose of bringing their land into the discussion about sites for a new Twins ballpark.

At first, the 8-acre site appeared to be an extremely unlikely location for a modern professional baseball facility. Besides being far smaller than most MLB sites (modern facilities typically require ), it was hemmed in by railroad tracks, a freeway, and two city streets passing on bridges. Though very near to Target Center, it was also adjacent to the Hennepin Energy Recovery Center (HERC), more commonly known as the city's "garbage burner," considered by some to be an undesirable neighbor for a ballpark.

But the site's perceived liabilities were easily offset by significant assets. Careful measurements were made by Lambrecht and local architect David Albersman, which proved that there was enough room for a baseball field and the amenities associated with a Major League ballpark. The site was adjacent to three large, underused parking ramps, and at the potential nexus of a light rail line then being planned (ultimately the Metro Transit Blue Line), and a commuter rail line also under consideration (the eventual Northstar Line). It was also controlled by a single owner who would be a willing seller. This fact alone would significantly simplify the process of acquisition by a governmental entity for a large-scale project. Owing largely to these logistical advantages, as well as an expansive view of the Minneapolis skyline, and the persistence of Lambrecht and Pogin's group, this site would eventually come to house Target Field.

In early 2000, Lambrecht's group commissioned a visit by Earl Santee of Populous (then known as HOK Sport) to evaluate whether the site had the potential to house Major League Baseball. His visit, independent of the Twins and all government entities, happened with no publicity whatsoever. Santee reviewed the site and reacted with skepticism, but saw no fatal flaws, nothing that made a ballpark impossible. He agreed to provide the working group with a concept drawing of a ballpark on that site, an image which was first published in August 2000, and quickly became the center of their ultimately successful campaign.

As Santee's dramatic drawing became more widely published, and Lambrecht and Pogin ramped up their lobbying efforts, others began to realize the advantages of the site. This included Mark Oyaas, founder of New Ballpark, Inc., a separate group of downtown Minneapolis business leaders, who sought to create a private financing plan for a stadium. They quickly settled on Rapid Park as their preferred ballpark site, which enhanced its visibility significantly. The Twins, however, completely ignored Rapid Park, and kept their distance from all of the ad hoc working groups. They would eventually go on record as believing that the Rapid Park site was too small and constrained to house the type of facility they sought to build.

Committees, contraction and competition (2000–2002)

2000 
No fewer than three committees were created in 2000 to offer recommendations on how to proceed.

The city of Minneapolis created a panel of citizens known as C-17 to consider various financing models. Their final report, issued in February 2001, while not specifically recommending a site, heavily featured the concept drawing of the Rapid Park site on multiple pages. The committee recommended that the city continue its discussions with New Ballpark, Inc., in the hopes of finding a private financing solution. Even before the work of the C-17 was complete, another (unnamed) group of staff analysts within city government, working with the Metropolitan Community Development Agency (MCDA), formally recommended the Rapid Park site to the City Council.

Simultaneously, the Twins assembled a 130-member advisory group, dubbed Minnesotans for Major League Baseball, which met to discuss possible stadium alternatives. Their deliberations included a meeting with Bud Selig, commissioner of baseball, to discuss economic issues within the sport. Their final report did not recommend a site (and did not even mention Rapid Park), but did provide advice to the team on how to proceed in winning public approval for any plan.

Late in 2000, Twins CEO Chris Clouser proposed playing three games in a temporary outdoor stadium to be built adjacent to the Mall of America in Bloomington. He hoped to demonstrate the pleasures of outdoor baseball as a way of jump-starting the political process. The proposal ran into problems from insurance companies, the Minnesota Vikings (who stood to lose Metrodome revenue) and Major League Baseball. It was ultimately scrapped.

2001 
During the 2001 legislative session, the Twins pushed for a new financing plan based on ideas gleaned from their advisory committee. The $300 million site-neutral plan would have featured a $150 million contribution from the Pohlads, $50 million from private enterprises, and the remaining $100 million in the form of an interest-free loan from the state of Minnesota. Many viewed the deal as significantly better for taxpayers than the 1997 plan. But the details of the financial arrangements once again were very complicated. Ultimately, the proposal fell victim to a political climate filled with distaste for the economics of baseball, general anti-stadium sentiments, and an unrelated budget standoff which nearly shut down the Minnesota government.

Despite that legislative misfire, in the summer of 2001 the city of Minneapolis became quite serious about the warehouse district site for a ballpark, after selecting the Twins' preferred riverfront site to house the new Guthrie Theater. Though no deal was struck to purchase the Rapid Park land at that time, an initial valuation of $10 million was assumed by the city for a roughly  parcel. Though not a realistic amount, it did fall conveniently within the restrictions of the 1997 referendum. The Twins were not involved in these discussions, and still exhibited no public interest whatsoever in the warehouse district location.

The Twins, stung by the repeated rejections, and feeling that they had no real prospects for a new ballpark in the Twin Cities, next became officially associated with Major League Baseball's long-rumored "contraction" plans. On November 6, 2001, MLB owners voted 28–2 to authorize the elimination of two teams, the Twins and the Montreal Expos (though the teams were not named publicly). The Pohlads were reportedly offered a $250 million check to fold their franchise.

This attempt at placing more pressure on decision-makers ultimately failed—spectacularly and quickly—when, a mere 10 days later, Hennepin County District Court Judge Harry Crump ruled that the Twins, by virtue of Major League Baseball's federal anti-trust exemption, could not act as a typical business and simply buy out their Metrodome lease. Their standing as a community asset meant that they had an obligation to honor the lease and continue playing. His decision was upheld by the Minnesota Court of Appeals on January 21, 2002, and the Minnesota Supreme Court refused to hear an appeal on February 5, 2002, effectively ending contraction as a negotiating tactic (though its echoes would remain until a new labor agreement between MLB and the MLBPA was reached on August 30, 2002).

2002 
Even as the Twins were forced to continue playing in 2002, the seeds of the eventual financing solution were sown when Hennepin County, in which the city of Minneapolis is located, began to express interest in being a financial partner in a ballpark. Unfortunately for the Twins, Minnesota governor Jesse Ventura wanted to foster competition between the various localities, thinking it would spur more creativity in the structure of any deal. Instead, St. Paul legislators, led by new mayor Randy Kelly, and aided by Hennepin County legislators wanting to keep their constituents off the hook, played hardball, and amended the ballpark bill so that only cities—not counties—could become financial partners in a ballpark. They knew that this move would eliminate both Hennepin County and Minneapolis (by virtue of the $10 million cap on any contribution), and leave only St. Paul as a viable partner. The bill passed, and Ventura signed it, but the strategy backfired. The Twins investigated and quickly rejected St. Paul as an implausible place to build. Nothing came of the bill, and it effectively ended any serious talk of the team moving to St. Paul.

As 2002 ended, the Twins proclaimed publicly their dissatisfaction with the Rapid Park site. Twins president Dave St. Peter was quoted as saying that the site was "set off to the side of Downtown, and [has] the garbage incinerator issue."

Evolving deals (2003–2005)

2003 
With the 2003 Minnesota Legislature locked in bitter budget issues, the ballpark was never a central focus. No ballpark bill was passed during the session.

New governor Tim Pawlenty, who, as a legislator, had been against public spending on stadiums, created the 20-member Stadium Screening Committee to "solve Minnesota's stadium conundrum." The committee was notable primarily for focusing equally on facilities for the Vikings and the Twins. They requested proposals from anyone anywhere with an idea for a stadium, and received 26, some more serious than others. Serious baseball proposals were received from Hennepin County/City of Minneapolis, and the City of St. Paul. The Twins, though they did not either send or endorse a proposal, did premiere a new design and scale model for the committee. Football proposals were received from the cities of Blaine and Eden Prairie. In the end, the recommendations in their final report (issued on February 2, 2004) were so general that they added nothing new to the debate, and the committee was dismissed as being for appearances only.

Separately, Bruce Lambrecht and Rich Pogin reframed the discussion of their site with a proposal to create "Twinsville" as a neighborhood anchored by the new Twins ballpark. Concept drawings showed apartment buildings, commercial buildings and townhouses flanking the ballpark to the north and south, all clustered around a newly daylighted Bassett Creek (which runs in a deep culvert beneath the land). In a nod to Pawlenty's football focus, one provocative drawing included a football stadium to the west (on the current HERC site), sharing a retractable roof with the baseball facility. But this concept also hinted at the possibility that the land might have more valuable uses than as a home for the Twins, an idea which would play a significant role later. Nevertheless, their reframing succeeded in jump-starting interest in the project as plans began to form for bringing about action during the forthcoming 2004 legislative session.

The year ended with Minneapolis officially authorizing negotiations with Land Partners II (the investment group which owned the Rapid Park site) to gain control of the land.

2004 
Early in 2004 the Twins unveiled a new vision of a stadium which could be built on any site with a footprint of at least four square blocks. Two concept drawings, with and without a retractable roof, were accompanied by a scale model (with roof) which was displayed at TwinsFest in January at the Metrodome.

The report of Gov. Pawlenty's Stadium Screening Committee set off what the Star Tribune described as "bitter financing competition between St. Paul and Hennepin County." Though never seriously in the running, St. Paul's efforts effectively sabotaged Hennepin County again. Pawlenty advanced a plan that could build up to three stadiums (Twins, Vikings, and Gophers) albeit with uncertain financing. That uncertainty, combined with dollar amounts now in the billions, and intense partisan bickering over unrelated budget issues, meant that the stadium bill took a back seat and was not passed during the 2004 session.

Behind the scenes in 2004, Hennepin County, led by commissioner Mike Opat, continued negotiations with the Twins, settling on the rough framework for financing which was ultimately used.

And the city of Minneapolis, acting on the recommendation of its own advisory committee, worked out an option (assignable to Hennepin County) to purchase the Rapid Park land. They agreed to pay $12.95 million plus  of adjacent land in exchange for the rights to purchase the  main ballpark site, effectively agreeing to pay $4.3 million per acre. This agreement expired at the end of 2004 when no stadium bill was passed, but it would play a key role in the later condemnation proceedings.

2005 
On April 26, 2005, Hennepin County and the Twins announced that they had reached a deal on financing. It closely matched what would be the eventual funding solution. In it, the Twins essentially relinquished their desire to put a roof on any new facility, accepting that it was not a financial possibility.

Though the ballpark was a subject of sometimes intense discussion in the 2005 Minnesota Legislative session, it fell victim to a political climate which resulted in a lengthy shutdown of Minnesota government due to a budget impasse. No action was taken in either the regular session or the special session which resolved the budget dispute. Until the very end of the year, proponents held out hope that Pawlenty would call a second special session just for the purpose of dealing with the stadium issue, but he did not.

Success (2006) 
With the entire Minnesota Legislature up for reelection in 2006, the session began with no expectation that a ballpark bill could pass. All parties were now committed to both the Hennepin County financing plan and the Rapid Park site, meaning all of the building blocks were in place for a deal, but optimism among the stakeholders was almost impossible to find.

On April 18, 2006 Hennepin County formally approved a plan to contribute $392 million to a Twins ballpark on the Rapid Park site. The funds would be raised through a county-wide 0.15% sales tax which would also raise funds to support the Hennepin County Libraries and youth sports activities within the county. The plan was exempted from any public referendum.

Final deliberations in the legislature centered on whether a referendum either was or should be required for any portion of the financing. All sides recognized that such a requirement would kill the project, and thus it became a proxy for deciding whether a ballpark should be built at all.

On May 20, 2006 the Minnesota Legislature approved a bill authorizing a new Twins ballpark on the Rapid Park site at an initial budgeted cost of $522 million. The cost was to be split between the Minnesota Twins (25%) and Hennepin County (75%). The Twins agreed to a total contribution of $130 million. A public referendum was not required.

On May 26, 2006, Governor Tim Pawlenty signed the legislation in front of a large crowd at the Metrodome before the start of a Twins game.

Several procedural votes were still necessary by the Hennepin County Board, any of which had the potential to derail the project. The final of these was held on August 29, 2006, officially authorizing the imposition of the sales tax, effective January 1, 2007. With the success of this vote, all legislative pieces were in place to formally authorize the ballpark, though acquisition of the Rapid Park land remained.

Construction of Target Field began on May 21, 2007.

Land dispute (2007) 
As work began on the ballpark, a final major snag threatened to derail the entire project for almost a year.

The bill authorizing the financing of Target Field specified a cap of $90 million for onsite infrastructure costs, which included land acquisition. Surprisingly, even though they were now authorized, Hennepin County did not take any action to acquire the land until very late in 2006.

The dollar amount on that deal had been $12.9 million, though the deal had also included  of adjacent land. Effectively, it would have paid for only three acres of the  site that Hennepin County now needed to acquire, at a proposed price of $4.3 million per acre.

In addition to those numbers being far apart, much had changed since the 2004 deal expired. The Hiawatha Light Rail (later Blue Line) had opened and become a huge success. Funding for the Northstar commuter rail line had been approved. As anticipated, these two lines would eventually converge on the northwest corner of the Rapid Park Site, now the likely location for a future multi-modal transportation hub. The site itself had been rezoned in 2005, allowing its development into high end commercial and residential space. Land Partners II had entered into a development agreement with Hines Corporation for this purpose, as a backup in the event that the land was not chosen as home for the Twins. Given the scarcity of land available in downtown Minneapolis, the land owners had multiple reasons to believe that the land's value had, in fact, increased substantially since 2004, with or without a ballpark.

Still, Lambrecht and Pogin, now acting as spokesmen for Land Partners II and Hines, had long been on record as "willing sellers" of the land for a ballpark, stipulating only that their investment group would expect "fair market value." Eventually, they admitted that they fully expected the transaction to take place in eminent domain (condemnation) proceedings, but accepted that inevitability because it would likely result in a fair purchase price, which they had reason to believe would be at least as much as the per-acre amount of the 2004 deal, or $4.3 million per acre (approximately $34 million for the entire 8-acre site), and perhaps significantly more due to market changes.

Hennepin County claimed that accepting the price set by an eminent domain judge was not an option for them, due to the infrastructure cap. Any additional money needed for the land would have to come out of some other piece of infrastructure. If the price set by a judge came in over their budget, they would have no funds to pay, and the project could collapse. But eminent domain did offer them the advantage of getting started on construction while working out the details of the land price later.

On September 19, 2006, Hennepin County officially authorized acquisition of the land, including doing so under eminent domain proceedings, if necessary. In late October the initial county appraisal of the land came in at the same $13.5 million that had been budgeted. Eminent domain proceedings were then initiated on November 1, 2006 as a precaution in case no agreement on land value could be reached by the time construction needed to start. The county set March 1, 2007 as the target date for finalizing acquisition of the Rapid Park site. There had still been no negotiations between the county and the land owners.

After months passed without an agreement, a harsh war of words erupted in the media in February 2007. The Twins angrily cancelled a planned unveiling of the ballpark design scheduled for February 15, declaring that the entire project was in jeopardy. Jerry Bell of the Twins and Mike Opat of Hennepin County gave multiple interviews in which they described the land owners as being "unwilling sellers," "greedy," "lawyered-up," painted them as "greedy landowners in black hats," and as not negotiating in good faith. Lambrecht and Pogin continued to insist that they had an obligation to their investors to secure nothing more than "fair market value" for the land. They repeatedly said that they would accept whatever valuation was determined in eminent domain proceedings, while media reports would later reveal their internal valuation (required by eminent domain laws) to be $65 million.

In early April 2007 Hennepin County received assurances that the Twins would provide additional funds, if necessary, to cover cost overruns on infrastructure, including the land acquisition. This allowed the initiation of "quick take" proceedings, and the county gained control of the site effective May 1, 2007, with a final sale price to be determined later. This effectively mitigated the problem of the infrastructure cap and allowed the unveiling of the ballpark design on April 12, and construction to begin on May 21, 2007.

Despite the beginning of construction, the land stalemate dragged on for months, as did the harsh rhetoric in the media. Some members of the media and public placed blame on Hennepin County for not securing the land before getting authorization to build the ballpark, while others laid the blame on the sellers for allegedly increasing their price once the legislation passed.

On August 19, 2007, a three-member condemnation panel set the value of the land at $23.8 million by a vote of 2–1. The next day, a separate opinion valuing the land at $33.2 million was filed by the dissenting judge. The landowners immediately announced that they would appeal the condemnation ruling, and a court date was set for November.

Ten days later, on August 30, 2007, the ceremonial groundbreaking took place, despite the ongoing land dispute (the event had been scheduled for August 2, but was postponed in the aftermath of the I-35W bridge collapse).

Eventually, after exchanging divergent values for several weeks, both parties agreed to mediation, and with the November court date fast approaching, the final agreement was reached on October 12, 2007, with a negotiated price of $29 million. To make the deal possible, the Twins had agreed to make up the $15 million difference between that price and what Hennepin County had originally budgeted. In exchange, they received the right to develop several acres near the ballpark. Land Partners II received property and air rights over Dock Street, which was to be created for access to the ballpark from the north.

With the establishment of the land value, the final potential obstacle to the completion of Target Field was resolved.

Naming 
On September 15, 2008, the Twins and Minneapolis-based Target Corporation announced that the ballpark would be named Target Field. Financial terms of the naming rights agreement were not disclosed. The company's investment also funded a pedestrian bridge from the ballpark to downtown, Target Plaza, more seating, canopies and public art.

Design
Designed by Populous with Bruce Miller as principal lead, Target Field is a modern take on other Populous-designed stadiums such as Oriole Park at Camden Yards in Baltimore, PNC Park in Pittsburgh, and Oracle Park in San Francisco.

The architects tried to avoid creating a replica of the old-style brick Camden Yards or modern urban design of the new Nationals Park (both also designed by Populous).  Instead, the design for the stadium employs local limestone, heated viewing areas and a heated field.  The stadium does not have a roof, but there is a canopy above the top deck.  The stadium is integrated with the intermodal Target Field station which connects the Metro Blue and Green Line light rail service with the Minneapolis terminus of the Northstar commuter rail line leading from the northwest.  Walter P Moore served as the structural engineer for the stadium and canopy.

The stadium does not have a retractable roof, though one was considered initially. Such a roof was cited to add $100 million to the total budget and none of the parties (Twins, Hennepin County, or Minnesota Legislature) was willing to pay for that cost. Much like other northern cities with outdoor professional baseball (i.e. Chicago, Detroit, Boston, Cleveland, New York), the weather in Minneapolis during a 162-game baseball season and playoffs can vary from early-spring snow to rain and hot, humid weather. The Metrodome was climate-controlled, and thus, protected the baseball schedule during the entire time that it had been the venue for the Minnesota Twins. However, many Twins fans and baseball purists argue that this same sterile, climate-controlled environment creates a less-than-desirable atmosphere for watching baseball. The architect also tested the feasibility of heated seats.

The site is about the same size as that of Fenway Park, and the ballpark holds roughly the same number of seats. The site is bounded by 3rd Avenue (southeast, right field, across from Target Center); 5th Street North (northeast, left field); 7th Street North (southwest, first base); Hennepin Environmental Recovery Center [garbage incinerator] and 6th Avenue North (northwest, third base). 3rd Avenue is a westbound one-way street which dips down under the right field seats and serves as a ramp to I-394 westbound. A separate, small westbound segment of 3rd Avenue, connecting 7th Street North with Glenwood Avenue, was renamed "Twins Way". The ballpark's street address, "1 Twins Way", is at the "foot" of the renamed street.

Construction

Mortenson Construction of Minneapolis built the stadium. Metropolitan Mechanical Contractors completed the mechanical contracting. Danny's Construction Company  erected the structural steel.  Subcontractors involved in the concrete work include CECO Concrete Construction, Gephart Electric, E&J Rebar, Ambassador Steel Corporation, Amsysco Inc., and Nordic Construction/Cemstone.

The first concrete slab was poured on December 17, 2007. The concrete portion of construction was completed in November 2008 with a roof deck pour for the Twins administration building. In March 2009 Tekna Kleen (commercial cleaning company), started doing the finishing cleaning touches to Target Field. In late August, 2009, the playing field was installed.

The Twins received the certificate of occupancy from Mortenson Construction on December 22, 2009. The Twins staff moved in on January 4, 2010.

LEED Certification
Target Field was initially awarded LEED Silver Certification by the U.S. Green Building Council, the second LEED-certified professional sports stadium in the United States, after Oracle Park. It is one of 3 baseball stadiums with LEED certification (the other being Nationals Park).  In 2017, Target Field was recertified LEED Gold, the first sports site in the nation to be so designated.

Upgrades

On February 12, 2008, the Twins announced $22.4 million in upgrades to the original design, and increased the Twins ownership stake in the ballpark to $167.4 million, bringing the total ballpark cost to $412 million. The upgrades were mainly based around increasing fan experience and comfort. The upgrades included an enlarged canopy soffit (the largest in baseball), protecting fans further from the elements, in light of the stadium not having a roof. Other upgrades included warming shelters, changing  of the exterior surface to Kasota stone, and increasing the number of restrooms and concession areas. The park features a modernized version of the original "Minnie and Paul Shaking Hands" logo used on the team's original uniforms from 1961 until 1986 (the logo has also been on the home uniforms since 2001). When a Twins player hits a home run, the Minnie and Paul sign lights up with strobe lights surrounding the Minnesota state outline and Minnie and Paul shake hands, akin to the Liberty Bell used at Citizens Bank Park in Philadelphia. The original flagpole from Metropolitan Stadium – completely restored – is located on the right field plaza. The flagpole was located at the American Legion post in Richfield after Metropolitan Stadium's closing, and was donated back to the Twins by the Legion as a gesture of goodwill.

On November 10, 2010, the Twins announced a number of upgrades to Target Field, all of which were completed in time for the 2011 season. Other changes include free Wi-Fi service for fans, expanded concession stand menus, and the addition of more radiant heaters and artwork around the ballpark. In total, the changes were expected to cost the Twins $4–6 million.

Additionally, the 14 black spruce trees located in the batter's eye were removed, following hitters' complaints that the trees interfered with the ability to see pitches as they would sometimes sway in the wind. The batter's eye wall itself was covered in a black material designed to reduce glare.

Non-baseball events

Concerts

Starting in 2013, Target Field has hosted every summer the Skyline Music Festival, named so because its seating, with only the seats around third base in an Amphitheatre-like manner, allows for extensive views of the Minneapolis skyline. The inaugural edition was held on July 26, 2013, featuring three of four bands in a package tour – Soul Asylum, Matthew Sweet and Big Head Todd and the Monsters, each of whom played one of their past albums in their entirety – along with Minnesota band Gear Daddies. The 6,752 tickets allowed by the section were sold out. The following edition was extended to two nights. August 8 featured an indie rock night sponsored by KCMP, featuring Andrew Bird, The New Pornographers, Thao and the Get Down Stay Down, S. Carey and Dosh. The following night was headlined by Melissa Etheridge, accompanied by the returning Gear Daddies, along with The Honeydogs, O.A.R. and The Rembrandts. Attendance was 2,500 for the first night and 5,500 for the second.

College football

Soccer

Hockey
Target Field was scheduled to host the 2021 NHL Winter Classic on January 1, 2021, but the event was postponed due to the COVID-19 pandemic. The 2022 NHL Winter Classic was held at the stadium on January 1, 2022. The St. Louis Blues defeated the Minnesota Wild 6-4. During the game, the tempature recorded was a high -3 degrees to a low -9.

Features

The stadium
The popular left-field Budweiser roof deck features mostly standing room and the only bonfire in the Majors.
The bullpens are "double-decker" style in left-center field.  The Twins' pen is farthest from the field, with the opposing team's pen below it, closest to the field.
The batter's eye featured 14 young black spruce trees (each about 6 feet high) the first year.  After criticism from Twins and opposing players concerning the shadows that they cast, the trees were removed prior to the second year.  Some were auctioned to fans and ticket holders while the rest were donated to Minnesota state parks.
Kasota limestone is used in much of the stadium and is from Kasota, near Mankato.
The admission gates are numbered according to former Twins legends and roughly located near to the positions that they played;
Left field gate is #6 honoring Tony Oliva (with his bronze statue nearby)
Centerfield gate is #3 for Harmon Killebrew
Target Plaza gate (in right field) is #34 in tribute to Kirby Puckett
Right field gate is #29 in tribute to Rod Carew
Home plate gate is #14 in honor of Kent Hrbek (featuring his bronze statue)

Target Plaza
Target Plaza is the gathering area behind the right field gate (Gate 34). On the wall of the adjacent parking garage facing the ballpark is a wind veil that makes waves as the wind blows. At night, color-changing lights add to the effect. They are lit up every night with the same color changing scheme as the veil, however, during games they are lit up red, in sequential order, to denote the current inning. In this plaza are statues of former players Kirby Puckett, Rod Carew, Kent Hrbek and Harmon Killebrew, as well as former owner Carl Pohlad, his wife Eloise Pohlad, and Twins mascot TC Bear. Following protests over the murder of George Floyd, a statue of former owner Calvin Griffith was removed in June 2020 because of his history of racist comments.

A large "Golden Glove" sits in the plaza in recognition of all Twins players to win the Gold Glove Award.  The statue can be sat on and is a popular photo attraction.  It is located exactly  from home plate, the distance of Harmon Killebrew's longest home run at Met Stadium (although his was hit into the left field upper deck).

There is also a monument that shows all the venues that Minnesota-based baseball teams played in. On the rails of the pedestrian skybridge are pennants that contain the rosters of all the Twins teams, and pennants of players, coaches, front office people, and other contributors who have been elected to the Twins Hall of Fame.

The field
The main flagpoles are in right field near the Plaza.  The largest pole, which flies the American Flag and POW/MIA Flag, is the original pole used at Metropolitan Stadium.  It was relocated to the Richfield Legion Post 435 after the Met was demolished, and, after being cut in half and refurbished, was re-installed for baseball at Target Field.  The first flags—both US and POW/MIA—donated by Post 435 were raised at the first Twins exhibition game by veteran and flagpole historian B.W. McEvers of Bloomington. On September 6, Jim Thome hit a solo home run against the Kansas City Royals that hit the flag pole.

The championship banners fly on small flagpoles located on the upper rim of the stadium beyond left field. On the stadium's upper rim in right-center field are small flagpoles that fly the flag for all the teams (including the Twins) in the division. The order that the flags fly are determined by the divisional standings.

Home plate is the same one used at the Metrodome.  After the Twins' final dome game (Game 3 of the 2009 ALDS), the plate was dug up and later installed at Target Field. In addition, several handfuls of dirt were taken from the sliding pit and pitcher's mound areas from the Metrodome and scattered near their counterparts at Target Field.

Twins bars and restaurants
At Target Field, there are four prominent bars and restaurants:

The Town Ball Tavern is located on the upper concourse by the left field corner, and is famous for serving the Jucy Lucy burger. The wood flooring is the same used on the basketball court at the Minneapolis Armory during the NBA Minneapolis Lakers stay, before leaving for Los Angeles.
Hrbek's is located on the main concourse behind home plate, and is named after former Twins first baseman Kent Hrbek.
There are two bars located on the upper concourse behind home plate, collectively called the Two Gingers Pubs. In one of these bars, fans can watch the Target Field organist, Sue Nelson, perform during games. Out of these three bars and restaurants, the Two Gingers Pub (formerly known as the Twins Pub) is the only one that does not serve food, however it is the only one in which the field is visible from inside.
The former Metropolitan Club (reserved for season ticket holders) was renovated prior to the 2019 season as restaurant Bat & Barrel, along with expansion of Target Plaza by moving Gate 34 further toward 1st Ave.

Concessions throughout also include several Minnesota favorites like walleye, wild rice soup, Kramarczuk's sausages, as well as a "State Fair Foods" stand where many items are served "on a stick", such as the J.D. Hoyt's pork chop.

In 2018, PETA declared Target Field number one on its annual list of vegan-friendly ballparks, thanks to the availability of foods like tofu vindaloo, vegan Sriracha Brats and Italian Sausages, Daiya cheese pizza, and Field Roast burgers and dogs.

Minnie and Paul logo

A large version of the Twins' original "Minnie and Paul" logo (designed by local artist, Ray Barton ) stands in center field.  It shows two players wearing the uniforms of the two minor-league teams that played in the Twin Cities before the Twins' arrival, the Minneapolis Millers and St. Paul Saints, shaking hands across the Mississippi River.  During various points in the game, the strobe lights surrounding the logo flash. This sign was a concept designed and illustrated by RipBang Studios but built by others.

When the Twins score a run by any means other than a home run, the strobe lights trace the border from the bottom-left corner for each Twins player that crosses home plate, symbolizing that a Twins player rounded the bases. For each strikeout, the corners of the sign flash to portray the strike zone. The strobe lights will flash at the end of the top of an inning if the Twins do not surrender a run during the inning. After a Twins home run, the strobe lights flash, Minnie and Paul shake hands, and the Mississippi River flows. After a Twins victory, the "T" and "s" in "Twins" will blink to show the message "Twins win" in addition to the animation shown following a Twins home run.

METRO and commuter rail connections
The stadium is well-connected to the city's transit network, being immediately adjacent to the "A" and "B" parking ramps of the large ABC Ramps complex at the end of Interstate 394, which include two major transit bus terminals and link to the rest of downtown Minneapolis via skyway.  Over 8,000 people typically arrive to each game via the Metro Blue Line and Metro Green Line, both of which terminate at Target Field Station, just 10 yards from the park's Gate 6. For fans arriving from the northwest suburbs, the Northstar Line commuter rail terminates in downtown Minneapolis with a station underneath the ballpark.

Park firsts
The first "soft event" at Target Field was an open house held for season ticket holders on March 20 and 21, 2010.
The first baseball game at the new ballpark took place on March 27, 2010, with a college baseball game between the University of Minnesota and Louisiana Tech attended by 37,757 fans.

The Twins played two preseason games against the St. Louis Cardinals on April 2 and 3, while the stadium's inaugural regular season game was on April 12,  against the Red Sox.

Opening day (April 12, 2010)

Other firsts

Comparison to the Metrodome

 *This is the official capacity.  However, Standing Room Only (SRO) tickets are available that can increase this capacity by approximately 2,500+.
 **6,000 seats were covered by a curtain; these and others made the stadium expandable to 55,883 during baseball playoffs and certain games in the last homestand and one-game playoff in October 2009.
 ***Controlled by the Minnesota Vikings football team.

Field dimensions are roughly comparable, with the left field area being a few feet closer to the plate, and the center field area being bounded by a 45° facet instead of a quarter-circle.

The Twins' previous homes in the Twin Cities, Metropolitan Stadium and the Metrodome, were friendly to hitters. The team intended to build Target Field as a "neutral" park, favoring neither hitters nor pitchers. However, following the 2010 regular season, statistics seemed to show that the park played more to the favor of pitchers than hitters.  It became known as a "pitcher's park" in that it is difficult for batters to hit home runs and the pitcher has an advantage. Twins star Justin Morneau spoke for many of the players' concerns by calling "right-center to left-center... ridiculous" and that it is "almost impossible for a right-handed hitter to [homer to the] opposite field and very difficult for lefties".  Since 2010, further studies indicated both the Twins and their opponents fared much better in  other offensive categories in spite of the lack of home runs and runs scored. Target Field doesn't come off as being primarily a pitcher's park anymore.

See also

 List of NCAA Division I baseball venues

References

External links

 Stadium site on Twins.com
 Minnesota Ballpark Authority official website
 The Twins Stadium Bill MN State Legislature HF2480, SF2297
 Minnesota Legislative Reference Library: Baseball Stadiums
 Ballpark FAQ

Baseball venues in Minnesota
College baseball venues in the United States
Leadership in Energy and Environmental Design basic silver certified buildings
Minnesota Golden Gophers baseball
Minnesota Twins stadiums
Major League Baseball venues
Rugby union stadiums in the United States
Populous (company) buildings
Sports venues completed in 2010
Sports venues in Minneapolis
Target Corporation
2010 establishments in Minnesota